The 2010–11 Championnat de France amateur 2 was the 13th edition since its establishment. The reserves of Metz were the defending champions. Due to the elongated appeals process involving each clubs' eligibility, the groups and fixtures were unveiled to the public on 15 July 2010 and the season began on 21 August and ended on 4 June 2011. There were 22 promoted teams from the regional leagues of the Division d'Honneur, replacing the 22 teams that were relegated from the Championnat de France amateur 2 following the 2009–10 season. A total of 130 teams competed in the league with 22 clubs suffering relegation to the sixth division, the Division d'Honneur. All non-reserve clubs that secured league status for the season were subject to approval by the DNCG before becoming eligible to participate.

Changes in 2010–11

Promotion and relegation
Teams relegated to Championnat de France amateur 2
 Balma
 Bordeaux B
 Calais
 Dunkerque
 Grenoble B
 Hyères
 Le Pontet
 Mantes
 Marck
 Montceau Bourgogne
 Montluçon
 Montpellier B
 Oissel
 Pontivy
 Quimper
 Racing Paris
 Strasbourg B
 Toulouse Fontaines

Teams promoted to Championnat de France amateur 2
 Bagnols Pont
 Bonchamp
 Borgo
 Brive
 Chambly
 Chartres
 Dinan-Léhon
 Forbach
 Grand-Synthe
 Granville
 Jura Dolois
 La Châtaigneraie
 Lannion
 Le Puy
 Lormont
 Paris B
 Prix-lès-Mézières
 Revel
 Saint Marcel
 Sablé-sur-Sarthe
 Schiltigheim
 Toulon-Le Las
 Vierzon

DNCG rulings
On 15 June 2010, following a study of each club's administrative and financial accounts in the Championnat de France amateur, the DNCG ruled that Besançon RC, Hyères FC, CS Louhans-Cuiseaux, FC Montceau Bourgogne, EDS Montluçon, Olympique Noisy-le-Sec, and RCF Paris would be relegated to the Championnat de France amateur 2. The organization also ruled that newly promoted club Calais RUFC would be excluded from ascending to the fourth division, while SO Cassis Carnoux, which had been relegated from the Championnat National, would also be excluded from the league. The second place club in Calais' group, CMS Oissel, who was set to replace Calais was also denied promotion to the Championnat de France amateur. All clubs had the option to appeal the decision.

On 7 July, Besançon, Hyères, and Oissel's appeals were heard by the DNCG Appeals Committee and, following deliberation and explanations from each club, the committee ruled in favor of Besançon, but upheld the appeals of Hyères and Oissel. The following day, the appeals committee granted both Louhans-Cuiseaux and Noisy-le-Sec appeals to stay in the fourth division. The committee, however, upheld the rulings of Calais, Montceau Bourgogne, Montluçon, and Racing Paris.

League tables

Group A

Group B

Group C

Group D

Group E

Group F

Group G

Group H

Notes 
  Administratively relegated to the league by the DNCG.

References

External links 
 CFA Official Page
 CFA 2 Standings and Statistics

 

Championnat National 3 seasons
5
France